Rhodopina albomaculata is a species of beetle in the family Cerambycidae. It was described by Charles Joseph Gahan in 1890.

References

albomaculata
Beetles described in 1890